Christian Ulmen (born 22 September 1975) is a German entertainer, actor, voice actor and audiobook narrator.

Career
Ulmen was born in Neuwied. He started his television career in 1996 as a video jockey on MTV Europe. He is known for his creative, and sometimes provocative, humour, which he displayed in TV shows such as Unter Ulmen or Mein neuer Freund, the German adaptation of Channel 4's My New Best Friend, and the award-winning TV series Dr. Psycho – Die Bösen, die Bullen, meine Frau und ich. Ulmen has also appeared in leading roles in successful cinema productions including Berlin Blues (2003), the screenplay Atomised (2006), based on Michel Houellebecq's novel of the same title, and Men in the City directed by Simon Verhoeven and released in October 2009.

Since 2013, Ulmen and Nora Tschirner play a team of investigators in the Weimar-based episodes of the Tatort series.

Personal life
Ulmen is agnostic.

Ulmen met his future wife Huberta in 1999 and they eventually married in 2005. They have a son together, but divorced in 2010.

In August 2010, Ulmen met Collien Fernandes and the couple married on 22 June 2011. They welcomed their first child in April 2012.

Selected filmography
Berlin Blues (2003), as Herr Lehmann
Rosa Roth: Flucht nach vorn (2005, TV series episode), as Harald Förster
 (2005), as Otto
Atomised (2006), as Michael Djerzinski
 (2006), as Paul
Dr. Psycho (2007–2008, TV series, 14 episodes), as Dr. Max Munzl
 (2008, TV film), as Bruno Karras
Men in the City (2009), as Günther Stobanski
Jerry Cotton (2010), as Phil Decker
 (2010), as Frieder Schulz
Vater Morgana (2010), as Lutz Stielike
 (2011), as Jonas
 (2012), as Georg
Tatort (since 2013, TV series, 9 episodes), as Kommissar Lessing
 (2014), as Viktor
 (2015), as Robert Beck
 (2015), as Daniel Hagenberger

Audiobooks (excerpt) 
2010 (Audible): Douglas Adams: Per Anhalter durch die Galaxis (The Hitchhiker’s Guide to the Galaxy), publisher: der Hörverlag, 
2011: Ian McEwan: Psychopolis, publisher: Diogenes Hörbuch,

Awards
2003 Bayerischer Filmpreis (Bavarian Film Award), Best Actor, for his role in Herr Lehmann
2007 Bayerischer Fernsehpreis (Bavarian TV Award), Best Actor, for his role in Dr. Psycho
2007 Adolf Grimme Award, for his role in Dr. Psycho

References

External links

Christian Ulmen at the German Dubbing Card Index

1975 births
Living people
People from Neuwied
German male film actors
German male television actors
21st-century German male actors